Diz (also Romanized as Dīz) is a village in Khvoresh Rostam-e Shomali Rural District, Khvoresh Rostam District, Khalkhal County, Ardabil Province, Iran. At the 2006 census, its population was 212, in 54 families.

References 

Towns and villages in Khalkhal County